is a Japanese game company that is best known for their Boku no Natsuyasumi (My Summer Vacation) series of video games.

Games developed

References

Video game companies of Japan
Video game development companies
Video game companies established in 1997
Japanese companies established in 1997